John Van Hamersveld (born September 1, 1941, Baltimore, Maryland, United States) is an American graphic artist and illustrator who designed record jackets for pop and psychedelic bands from the 1960s onward. Among the 300 albums are the covers of Magical Mystery Tour by the Beatles, Crown of Creation by Jefferson Airplane, Exile on Main Street by the Rolling Stones, and Hotter Than Hell by Kiss. His first major assignment, in 1963, was designing the poster for the surf film The Endless Summer, after which he served as Capitol Records' head of design from 1965 to 1968. During that time, he worked on the artwork for albums by Capitol artists such as the Beatles and the Beach Boys. He also oversaw the design of the psychedelic posters for the Pinnacle Shrine exposition.

The Endless Summer 
 In 1963, Van Hamersveld was hired by director and filmmaker Bruce Brown to design the iconic Endless Summer movie poster using a photograph taken by Bob Bagley, general manager and camera man for Bruce Brown Films. In the staged photograph originally taken at Salt Creek, Brown is positioned in the foreground with his surfboard on his head and the movie's two stars, Robert August and Mike Hynson, between Brown and the setting sun. He had learned this technique at Art Center College of Design in Pasadena where he took night classes, graduating later that year. He converted the photo into an abstract design by reducing each color to a single tone and giving each image a single, hard edge.

Other work 
He designed an official poster and 360-foot-long mural for the 1984 Los Angeles Olympic Games; illustrations for Esquire, Rolling Stone, Billboard; and branding and logos for Fatburger, Contempo Casuals, and Broadway Deli.

Later projects 
In 1997 Van Hamersveld started his own line of products revisiting his work from 1964 to 1974, which he calls "Post-Future". With the printmaking of a fine art edition of the Endless Summer poster, he moved his design work into his Coolhous studio in Santa Monica and between analog and digital environments managed to create works such as the posters for the 2005 Cream reunion concert at the Royal Albert Hall.

In 2013 he celebrated 50 years in graphic design by producing a vinyl EP sleeve for Liverpool-based blues-rockers Sankofa, in addition to publishing the book John Van Hamersveld—Coolhaus Studio: 50 Years of Graphic Design. He continued that line of work in 2014 with two more artworks for records by Asher Roth and the Gaslight Anthem.

In April 2018 Van Hamersveld completed a mural on a storage tank near Grand Avenue in El Segundo, California. "El Segundo is where my career started, as a surfer and an artist," he told the Los Angeles Times.

Album covers 

Among his album covers are:

References

External links 
 John Van Hamersveld Website
 Article --- "John Van Hamersveld" Swindle, Issue #05
 Article --- "John Van Hamersveld" on The Giant: The Definitive Obey Giant Site
 Press Release for recent show at Shepard Fairey's Gallery
 AnaheimOC.org Surfing Podcast
 the Rock And Roll Report "Making of the Cover for Exile on Main Street"
 
 

1941 births
Album-cover and concert-poster artists
Film poster artists
Artists from California
Living people
Artists from Baltimore
Psychedelic artists